Inspiral Carpets Greatest Hits is a compilation album by British band Inspiral Carpets.  It was released by Mute Records in the latter part of 2003; it is essentially the first CD from the Cool As box set issued earlier that same year.

Track listing
"Keep the Circle Around" – 3:49
"Butterfly" – 2:33
"Joe" – 3:22
"Find Out Why" – 2:03
"Move" – 3:26
"This Is How it Feels" – 3:13
"She Comes in the Fall" – 4:11
"Biggest Mountain" – 4:29
"Weakness" – 4:17
"Caravan" – 5:48
"Please Be Cruel" – 3:37
"Dragging Me Down" – 4:33
"Two Worlds Collide" – 4:41
"Generations" – 2:49
"Bitches Brew" – 3:51
"How it Should Be" – 3:17
"Saturn 5" – 3:58
"I Want You" – 3:09
"Uniform" – 3:54
"Come Back Tomorrow" – 3:40

References

2003 greatest hits albums
Inspiral Carpets albums
Mute Records compilation albums